

Saiyaan Way is a Pakistani TV drama. This drama is written by Samina Nazeer, produced and directed by Barkat Sidiki. It originally aired on TV One Pakistan.

Plot 
Qirat, Amber, and Zobiya are loving sisters living with their father in a modest neighborhood.
But a grave crisis occurs when the villainous Arbaz starts blackmailing the young Zobiya. Then Qirat takes a tough decision that shatters the peace of their happy home. The lively Shahvez who adores Qirat supports her while his more serious cousin Wahaj keeps silent about his love for her.

Now Arbaz has returned to take revenge - and Wahaj will have to declare his feelings.

Cast 
 Kiran Tabeir
 Rida Ali
 Imran Patel
 Tabbasum Arif as Maria's mother
 Adil Murad as Shahvez
 Inaya Sheikh
 Birjees Farooqui as Salma (Wahaj's mother)
 Farhad Fareed
 Hafsa Butt

International release
The series is available for streaming under the title "Web of Deceit" on Hilal Play.

References 

Pakistani drama television series
2016 Pakistani television series debuts
2018 Pakistani television series debuts
2018 Pakistani television series endings
Urdu-language television shows
TVOne Pakistan